Padenodes unifascia is a moth of the family Erebidae. It was described by Walter Rothschild in 1912. It is found in New Guinea.

References

Nudariina
Moths described in 1912